Godowa  is a village in the administrative district of Gmina Strzyżów, within Strzyżów County, Subcarpathian Voivodeship, in south-eastern Poland.

The village has a population of 2,100.

References

Godowa